Lena Noreses, (born 6 January 1994, in Windhoek) is a Namibian women's international footballer who plays as a midfielder. She is a member of the Namibia women's national football team. She was part of the team at the 2014 African Women's Championship. On club level she played for Germania Hauenhorst in Germany.

References

1994 births
Living people
Namibian women's footballers
Namibia women's international footballers
Footballers from Windhoek
Women's association football midfielders
Expatriate women's footballers in Germany
Namibian expatriate women's footballers
Namibian expatriate sportspeople in Germany